Iulomorphidae is a family of millipedes in the order Spirostreptida. There are about 11 genera and more than 60 described species in Iulomorphidae.

Genera
These 11 genera belong to the family Iulomorphidae:
 Amastigogonus Brölemann, 1913
 Atelomastix Attems, 1911
 Dinocambala Attems, 1911
 Euethogonus
 Eumastigonus Chamberlin, 1920
 Iulomorpha Porat, 1872
 Merioproscelum Verhoeff, 1924
 Podykipus Attems, 1911
 Samichus Attems, 1911
 Thaumaceratopus Verhoeff, 1924
 Victoriocambala Verhoeff, 1944,1944

References

Spirostreptida
Millipede families